Dimorphotheca jucunda, the delightful African daisy, is a species of flowering plant in the family Asteraceae. It is native to South Africa, Lesotho and Eswatini, and introduced to Ireland and Tasmania. As its synonym Osteospermum jucundum, it and two of its cultivars, 'Blackthorn Seedling' and 'Langtrees' have gained the Royal Horticultural Society's Award of Garden Merit.

References

jucunda
Flora of South Africa
Flora of Lesotho
Flora of Swaziland
Plants described in 1936